Floy Mae Clements (née Stephens November 20, 1891 – September 29, 1973) was an American politician in Illinois notable for being the first African American woman to serve in the Illinois General Assembly upon her election to the Illinois House of Representatives in 1958.

Biography
Floy Mae Clements was born November 20, 1891 in Memphis, Tennessee to Alexander Stephens and Katie Stephens Smith. Her family moved to Chicago when she was three. Her father would open a chain of restaurants on the south side of the city. She attended Wilberforce University and graduated with a degree in social studies. While at Wilberforce, she portrayed Alma Prichard in the 1920 silent film drama Within Our Gates, directed by Oscar Micheaux, and starring Evelyn Preer. She also had a supporting role in Micheaux's 1920 film The Brute.

Clements moved back to Chicago, settling in the Grand Boulevard community. In 1927, she joined the 4th Ward Democratic Organization as a precinct captain during a time when few African Americans supported the Democratic Party. She would eventually serve as the committeewoman under four different elected Ward Committeeman.

During World War II, Clements was a member of the American Red Cross Motor Corps. Other notable civic involvement included service as Grand Traveling Deputy of the State of Illinois for the Improved Benevolent and Protective Order of Elks of the World, Worthy Matron of the Electa Chapter and Grand Officer of the Eureka Grand Chapter of the Order of the Eastern Star and service to St. Mark Methodist Church.

Clements ran for the Illinois House of Representatives in the 1958 primary with the backing of 4th ward Alderman Claude Holman.

She served as one of three representatives from the 22nd district with Republican Elwood Graham and fellow Democrat Charles F. Armstrong. During her single term in the House, Clements was assigned to the following committees; Education; Military & Veteran Affairs; Public Aid, Health Welfare and Safety; and Roads & Bridges. She was succeeded by Lycurgus Conner.

Floy Clements died in Niles, Illinois and is buried at Lincoln Cemetery in Worth Township, Illinois.

See also
List of African-American officeholders (1900–1959)

References

1891 births
1973 deaths
20th-century American women politicians
20th-century American politicians
Actresses from Memphis, Tennessee
African-American state legislators in Illinois
African-American women in politics
American silent film actresses
African-American actresses
20th-century American actresses
Democratic Party members of the Illinois House of Representatives
Politicians from Chicago
Wilberforce University alumni
Women state legislators in Illinois
20th-century African-American women
20th-century African-American people